Rebouças is a municipality in the state of Paraná in the Southern Region of Brazil. being filled with some hills on the surroundings and some parts of the city, the high structures are a tower in the hill of Mourão and the church [being a part of the Catholic church ], a big part of the ethnicity in the city are Polish and Ukrainians.

History
The village began in the place known as Butiazal and, around 1902, it was transferred to the place called Rio Azul where it is located. When the railroad reached the town of Rio Azul, the district was renamed Antônio Rebouças, who was the engineer who guided the construction of the railroad. Later, the name was simplified to Rebouças.

Created through State Law nº 2738, of March 31, 1930, and installed on September 21 of the same year, it was dismembered from São João do Triunfo.

GDP per capita growth 
Rebouças has an GDP per capita of R$25,723 (Brazilian real) as of 2019, compared to R$20,498 (Brazilian real) in 2015 or R$11,639 (Brazilian real) in 2010.  Although it is growing, the Brazilian Real has devaluated over time.

The Judiciary 
 Court Judge: James Byron W. Bordignon

State Public Prosecutor's Office 
 State Public Prosecutor / Public Attorney: Murilo Cezar Soares e Silva
 Brazil: Art.129, II, of the Federal Constitution, which, combined with art.197, assigns to Public Attorneys the institutional function of ensuring the proper application of health laws by the Public Powers and services of public relevance.
http://www.mp.pr.gov.br

See also
List of municipalities in Paraná

References

Municipalities in Paraná